is a single-member constituency of the House of Representatives in the Diet of Japan. It is located in Northern Kagoshima and consists of the cities of Akune, Izumi, Satsumasendai, Hioki, Ichikikushikino, Isa and Aira as well as the towns of Satsuma, Nagashima and Yūsui.
In 2021 the district had 319,010 eligible voters.

Before the electoral reform of 1994, the area was split between the multi-member districts Kagoshima 1 that elected four Representatives by single non-transferable vote and Kagoshima 2 with three representatives.

After its creation, the new 3rd district was initially a solid "conservative kingdom", a safe seat for the Liberal Democratic Party. Its first representative Tadahiro Matsushita (Obuchi faction, pre-reform: 2nd district) was followed by Kazuaki Miyaji (Mitsuzuka faction, pre-reform: 1st district) in 2000. Matsushita became a representative for the Kyūshū proportional representation block. In the "postal Diet" of 2005, he was a postal privatization rebel and tried to retake Kagoshima 3rd district as an independent in the ensuing snap election but lost to Miyaji. After initially declaring his retirement from politics, Matsushita returned in 2009 as a candidate for the People's New Party with Democratic support and won the district against Miyaji. After Matsushita's suicide in 2012, Miyaji won the resulting by-election against government candidate Takeshi Noma. In the general House of Representatives election less than three months later, Miyaji lost the district to Noma.

After the 2017 electoral reapportionment, Kagoshima Prefecture lost one of its constituencies and much of the current 3rd district had previously belonged to the Kagoshima 4th district. Subsequently, the 2017 elections were won by Yasuhiro Ozato the previous Representative of the 4th district.

List of representatives

Election results

References 

Kagoshima Prefecture
Districts of the House of Representatives (Japan)